The Alfalfa mosaic virus RNA 1 5′ UTR stem-loop represents a putative stem-loop structure found in the 5′ UTR in RNA 1 of alfalfa mosaic virus. RNA 1 is responsible for encoding the viral replicase protein P1. This family is required for negative strand RNA synthesis in the alfalfa mosaic virus and may also be involved in positive strand RNA synthesis.

See also 
 Alfalfa mosaic virus coat protein binding (CPB) RNA

References

External links 
 

Cis-regulatory RNA elements
Bromoviridae